Hopedale (Inuit language: Agvituk) is a town located in the north of Labrador, the mainland portion of the Canadian province of Newfoundland and Labrador. Hopedale is the legislative capital of the Inuit Land Claims Area Nunatsiavut, and where the Nunatsiavut Assembly meets. As of the 2021 census it has a population of 596.

History
Hopedale was founded as an Inuit settlement named Agvituk, Inuktitut for "place of the whales".  In 1782, Moravian missionaries from Germany arrived in the area to convert the population. They renamed the settlement Hopedale (Hoffental in German) shortly afterward. The Hopedale Mission is still standing and is thought to be the oldest wooden-frame building in Canada standing east of Quebec. As such, it was named a National Historic Site of Canada. It is currently run by the Agvituk Historical Society as a part of a museum on the history of missionaries in the area.

From 1953 to 1968 a joint Royal Canadian Air Force-United States Air Force's Hopedale Air Station was located on the hills above Hopedale. Civilian personnel lived in the main part of town. Since 1968 the area has remained abandoned other than maintenance of non-military communications towers nearby.

Nunatsiavut

On December 1, 2005, Hopedale became the legislative capital of the autonomous region of Nunatsiavut which is the name chosen by the Labrador Inuit when the Labrador Inuit Land Claims Agreement Act was successfully ratified by the Canadian Government and the Inuit of Labrador. Nain, further north, is the administrative capital. The land claim cedes limited self-rule for the Nunatsiavut government in Northern Labrador and North-Eastern Quebec, granting title and aboriginal rights. The Inuit of Labrador do not own this land per se, but they do have special rights related to traditional land use as aboriginals. That said, the Labrador Inuit will own  within the Settlement Area, officially designated as Labrador Inuit Lands. As legislative capital, Hopedale is the location of the Nunatsiavut Assembly Building.

Demographics 

The majority of people in Hopedale (79%) speak English as a first language, but a significant minority (21%) speak Inuktitut.

About 83% of the population identify themselves as Inuit, 16% are of mainly European descent, and 1% are of Punjabi origin.

About 87% of the population belongs to a Protestant denomination, about 2% are Roman Catholic, and another 1% are Sikh.  About 10% are not affiliated with any religion.

Transportation

There are no roads that connect Hopedale with the rest of Newfoundland and Labrador.

Hopedale Airport, a small public airport, connects the area with small communities in Newfoundland and Labrador and connections beyond made via Goose Bay Airport. The airport was built in the mid 1960s to provide air support to former USAF Hopedale Air Station. Since 1968 the airport is used by civilians.

The airport handles only small turboprop aircraft or helicopters. There is only one service building at the airport. The airport is connected to Hopedale via Airstrip Road.

Between mid-June and mid-November (pending ice conditions), the ferry MV Kamutik W, operated by the Newfoundland and Labrador Government, provides weekly service from Goose Bay along the Atlantic Coast, with stops in Rigolet, Makkovik, Postville, Hopedale, Nain, and Natuashish. Small boats are used to access nearby areas by water.

Local land based transportation in the community is made by private vehicles (cars, trucks, ATV) and snowmobile in winter. There are only a few roads in the community, all gravel:
 Airstrip Road - access to Hopedale Airport
 American Road - former access road to USAF radar stations and barracks
 Carpenter Road and Drive - serves new residential area
 Government Road - former route home to non-military personnel for former USAF radar station
 Nanuk Road
 Water Road - road to main part of Hopedale

Services

Policing in Hopedale is provided by the Royal Canadian Mounted Police which has a Hopedale Detachment staffed by four officers. The current detachment was completed in 1994.

There is no hospital located in Hopedale and only basic medical services are provided by Hopedale Community Clinic. The clinic is operated by Labrador-Grenfell Health Authority and is staffed by three nurses/nurse practitioners. Physicians visit periodically, and are also available by video conference. Advanced care requires patients to be flown out of town by air ambulance to the nearest hospital which is in Happy Valley-Goose Bay.

Hopedale Volunteer Fire Department is a small fire and rescue service with a single pumper stored at the fire hall located next to the RCMP detachment near Water Road.

Canada Post has a post office (19 Harbour Drive B) located in town.

Amos Comenius Memorial School at Nanuk Hill, with grades Kindergarten to Grade 12, is the only school in Hopedale.

DJ's Convenience, Big Land Grocery, Northland Enterprises (with Sylvia's Take Out) are the only stores selling food and other convenience goods in town.

Government

AngajukKâk are equivalent of mayor in Hopedale and are elected every four years. The incumbent is Marjorie Flowers.

Past AngajukKâk:

 Judy Dicker, 2006-2010 
 Wayne Piercy, 2010-2014
 Jimmy Tuttuak, 2014-2015

Local attractions

There are few local attractions:

 Moravian Mission Complex and Museum
 Mid-Canada Line Site 200 - a former American and RCAF facility and was the most easterly repeater radar station and with view of Hopedale from the highest point in town
 Tropospheric scatter antennas and concrete base of former Radome 
 Amaguk Inn - offers local accommodation for visitors (18 rooms) and also sells local arts and crafts

Climate

See also
 Hopedale Air Station
 List of cities and towns in Newfoundland and Labrador
 Jens Haven
 Nunatsiavut
 Nunatsiavut Assembly Building

References

Inuit community governments in Newfoundland and Labrador
Populated places in Labrador
History of the Labrador Province of the Moravian Church
Hudson's Bay Company trading posts
Capitals of country subdivisions in Canada
Road-inaccessible communities of Newfoundland and Labrador